The 1999 Men's EuroHockey Nations Championship was the eighth edition of the Men's EuroHockey Nations Championship, the quadrennial international men's field hockey championship of Europe organized by the European Hockey Federation. It was held in Padua, Italy from 1 to 12 September 1999.

The two-time defending champions Germany won a record-extending fifth title by defeating the Netherlands 8–7 in penalty strokes after the match finished 3–3 after extra time. England won the bronze medal by defeating Belgium 7–2.

Qualified teams

Preliminary round

Pool A

Pool B

Classification round

Ninth to twelfth place classification

9–12th place semi-finals

Eleventh place game

Ninth place game

Fifth to eighth place classification

5–8th place semi-finals

Seventh place game

Fifth place game

First to fourth place classification

Semi-finals

Third place game

Final

Final standings

Awards
Best Player of the Tournament:  Christian Mayerhofer
Best goalkeeper of the Tournament:  Chris Ashcroft
Topscorer of the Tournament:  Bram Lomans

See also
1999 Women's EuroHockey Nations Championship

References

 
Men's EuroHockey Nations Championship
EuroHockey Nations Championship
International field hockey competitions hosted by Italy
Sport in Padua
EuroHockey Nations Championship
EuroHockey Nations Championship
Field hockey at the Summer Olympics – Men's European qualification
EuroHockey Nations Championship
EuroHockey Nations Championship